Evan Paul Conti (born April 6, 1993) is the American-Israeli head coach of the New York Institute of Technology Division II NCAA men's basketball team. He played three years of professional basketball in Israel, for Hapoel Be'er Sheva, Hapoel Migdal Haemek, and Hapoel Afula. He also won a gold medal in basketball with Team USA at the 2013 Maccabiah Games.

High school
Conti is from Bayside, Queens, New York, and is Jewish.

Conti ranks fifth all-time at Holy Cross High School in Flushing, New York, with 1,120 career points; he also grabbed nearly 600 rebounds in his high school career for Coach Paul Gilvary's Knights. He averaged nearly 18 points, 10 rebounds, and five assists per game as a senior, earning Catholic High School Athletic Association (CHSAA) First Team recognition. The Knights had a 17–12 record that year.

He was selected to the Jewish Sports Review 2010–11 Boys High School All-America Basketball Team. NYHoops.com ranked Conti as the 13th-best player in New York City in March 2011.

AAU
He also played AAU for the Rising Stars. The Rising Stars came in 8th in the country at the Division 1 Nationals in 2010.

Maccabiah Games
Conti played with Team USA in the 2013 Maccabiah Games, winning a gold medal.

College
In college, Conti played guard for Quinnipiac University from 2011 to 2015 on scholarship. Conti averaged 9.0 points, 4.8 rebounds, and 2.6 assists per game as a senior with Quinnipiac. He scored 26 points against Niagara.

International career
He played three years of professional basketball in Israel, for Hapoel Be'er Sheva, Hapoel Migdal Haemek, and Hapoel Afula.

Coaching career
Conti joined NYIT as an assistant coach in 2018. He became the interim head coach on February 23, 2019, coaching two games and winning his first victory over LIU Post. In May 2019, Conti was named the head coach at 26 years of age.

References

External links
Twitter page
Evan Conti, ESPN
"Former QU Men’s Basketball Standout Evan Conti Inks Professional Contract in Israel"

1993 births
Living people
American expatriate basketball people in Israel
Basketball players from New York City
Basketball coaches from New York (state)
Hapoel Be'er Sheva B.C. players
Holy Cross High School (Flushing) alumni
NYIT Bears men's basketball coaches
People from Bayside, Queens
Point guards
Quinnipiac Bobcats men's basketball players
Shooting guards
Sportspeople from Queens, New York
American men's basketball players
Israeli men's basketball players
Israeli American
Competitors at the 2013 Maccabiah Games
Maccabiah Games gold medalists for the United States
Maccabiah Games basketball players of the United States
Jewish men's basketball players
Jewish Israeli sportspeople
Jewish American sportspeople
21st-century American Jews